AppFlood is a programmatic mobile advertising platform created by PapayaMobile. It was launched in 2012, and in 2014 became the first mobile real-time bidding platform to be engineered and made available in China.

History
AppFlood was launched in July 2012 by PapayaMobile, a mobile technology company previously known for its social gaming network.  By AppFlood's one-year anniversary, it had attracted 4,500 Android users and was delivering 1.3 billion impressions.   In April 2014, AppFlood launched a real-time bidding platform, the first to be engineered and made available in China. The company had a stated goal being the leading company bridging China and western countries.  By August 2014 AppFlood had sent ads to 400 million mobile devices globally. AppFlood is headquartered in Beijing and has offices in San Francisco and London.

References

External links
Official Website
RoUK.ro

Online advertising services and affiliate networks
Marketing companies established in 2012